Elisha Strong Norton (August 17, 1873 in Conneaut, Ohio – March 5, 1950 in Aspinwall, Pennsylvania), also nicknamed "Leiter," was a right-handed professional baseball pitcher who played from  to  for the Washington Senators. He is the great-grandfather in law of pitcher John Fulgham.

Prior to playing professional baseball, Norton attended Ohio State University, where, in 1895, he was the "star" of the team. 

He made his big league debut on August 8, 1896. He went 3–1 with a 3.07 ERA in eight games (five starts). In 44 innings, he had 14 walks and 13 strikeouts. The following season, he went 2–1 with a 6.88 ERA in 17 innings. He walked 11 and struck out three. Although a pitcher by trade, he also played three games in the outfield that season. On June 5, 1897, he played his final big league game.

Overall, Norton went five and two with a 4.13 ERA in 61 innings (12 games, seven games started). He walked 25 batters and struck out 13. For a pitcher, he wasn't a bad hitter. He hit .243 in 37 career at-bats.

After his death, he was buried at Conneaut City Cemetery in Conneaut, Ohio.

References
Baseball-Reference
Baseball Almanac

1873 births
1950 deaths
Major League Baseball pitchers
Washington Senators (1891–1899) players
Baseball players from Ohio
19th-century baseball players
Atlanta Crackers players
Grand Rapids Rippers players
Grand Rapids Gold Bugs players
Toronto Canucks players
Minneapolis Millers (baseball) players
People from Conneaut, Ohio
Ohio State Buckeyes baseball players